Maljamar is an unincorporated community in Lea County, New Mexico, United States. The zip code is 88264. It is close to Hobbs and Carlsbad.

According to legend, Maljamar's founder William Mitchell named the town after his three children Malcom, Janet and Margaret.

Maljamar is the town where Michael Scofield steals supplies in Bolshoi Booze, an episode of the television series Prison Break. President Barack Obama visited Maljamar on March 21, 2012 to tour the local oil fields.

References 

Unincorporated communities in New Mexico
Unincorporated communities in Lea County, New Mexico